Acmaeoderopsis junki is a species of metallic wood-boring beetle in the family Buprestidae. It is found in Central America and North America.

Subspecies
These two subspecies belong to the species Acmaeoderopsis junki:
 Acmaeoderopsis junki junki
 Acmaeoderopsis junki peninsularis (Barr, 1972)

References

Further reading

 
 
 

Buprestidae
Articles created by Qbugbot
Beetles described in 1929